Nationality words link to articles with information on the nation's poetry or literature (for instance, Irish or France).

Events

 January — Philosopher Hu Shih, the primary advocate for the revolution in Chinese literature at this time to replace scholarly language with the vernacular, publishes an article in the magazine New Youth (Xin Qingnian) titled "A Preliminary Discussion of Literature Reform", in which he originally emphasizes eight guidelines that all Chinese writers should take to heart (next year he will compress the list to four points).
 February — The Little Review moves from Chicago to New York City with the help of Ezra Pound (its foreign editor from May).
 May — W. B. Yeats acquires Thoor Ballylee in Ireland.
 May 2 — English poet Marian Allen completes the poem "To A. T. G." a few days after hearing of the death in action of her fiancé Arthur Greg, the first of several to his memory.
 May–June — T. S. Eliot takes over as editor of The Egoist, a London literary monthly, when Richard Aldington leaves for the British Army.
 July
 English poet Siegfried Sassoon issues his "Soldier's Declaration" against prolongation of World War I and is sent (with assistance from Robert Graves) by the military authorities to Craiglockhart War Hospital in Edinburgh, where on August 17 Wilfred Owen introduces himself. With his encouragement, Owen writes "Anthem for Doomed Youth" and "Dulce et Decorum est"; the latter work's horrifying imagery makes it one of the most popular condemnations of war ever written. Like almost all Owen's poetry, these remain unpublished until after his death in action next year.
 With the United States not yet fighting in World War I, Americans John Dos Passos, E. E. Cummings and Robert Hillyer volunteer for the S.S.U. 60 of the Norton-Harjes Ambulance Corps.
 Last issue of Others: A Magazine of the New Verse, founded by Alfred Kreymborg in 1915 and publishing  poetry and other writing, as well as visual art; contributors include William Carlos Williams, Wallace Stevens, Marianne Moore, Mina Loy, Ezra Pound, Conrad Aiken, Carl Sandburg, T. S. Eliot, Amy Lowell, Hilda Doolittle, Djuna Barnes, Man Ray, Skipwith Cannell and Lola Ridge.

 July 15 — Welsh-language poet Hedd Wyn posts his awdl "Yr Arwr" ("The Hero") as his entry for the poetry competition at the National Eisteddfod of Wales on the same day as he marches off with the 15th Battalion Royal Welch Fusiliers towards the Battle of Passchendaele in which he will be killed a fortnight later. On September 6 at the ceremony of Chairing of the Bard at the Eisteddfod, held at Birkenhead, the empty druidical chair which Wyn, as winner, should have occupied is draped in a black sheet, "The festival in tears and the poet in his grave." This becomes known as "The Eisteddfodd of the Black Chair."
 Summer — Russian writer Boris Pasternak composes My Sister, My Life; this circulates orally and in manuscript for several years before publication. 
 c. Summer — The Siuru expressionistic and neo-romantic literary movement in Estonia is formed by a group of young poets and writers.
 October 20 — 51-year-old poet W. B. Yeats marries 25-year-old Georgie Hyde-Lees at Harrow Road register office in London with Ezra Pound as best man, a couple of months after having had a proposal of marriage to his ex-mistress's daughter, Iseult Gonne, rejected.
 November — Publication of The Muse in Arms, an anthology of British war poetry.

Works published in English

Australia
 Arthur Henry Adams, Australian Nursery Rimes, Australia
 C. J. Dennis:
 The Glugs of Gosh
 Doreen
 Henry Lawson, "Scots of the Riverina", Australia

United Kingdom

 Aftermath of Easter Week, Ireland
 Rupert Brooke, Selected Poems
 May Wedderburn Cannan, In War Time
 Richard Church, The Flood of Life
 Austin Clarke, The Vengeance of Fionn (Irish poet)
 Walter de la Mare, The Sunken Garden, and Other Poems
 John Drinkwater, Tides
 Hilda Doolittle (H.D.), The Tribute And Circe: Two Poems (American poet published in the UK)
 T. S. Eliot:
 Prufrock, and other observations
 Ezra Pound: His Metric and Poetry (criticism)
 Robert Graves, Fairies and Fusiliers
 Ronald Gurner, War's Echo
 Ivor Gurney, Severn and Somme
 Thomas Hardy:
 Collected Poems
 Moments of Vision and Miscellaneous
 F. W. Harvey, Gloucestershire Friends: Poems from a German Prison Camp
 May Herschel-Clarke, Behind the Firing Line and other poems of the War
 W. N. Hodgson, Verse and Prose in Peace and War (posthumous)
 D. H. Lawrence, Look! We Have Come Through
 Joseph Lee, Work-a-Day Warriors (Scottish poet)
 Ewart Alan Mackintosh, A Highland Regiment and Other Poems (Scottish poet)
 John Masefield, Lollingdon Downs, and Other Poems
 Alice Meynell, A Father of Women, and Other Poems
 Charles Murray, The Sough o' War (Scottish poet writing in Doric dialect)
 George William Russell ("Æ"), Salutation
 Vita Sackville-West, Poems of East and West
 Siegfried Sassoon, The Old Huntsman, and Other Poems
 Will Streets, The Undying Splendour (posthumous)
 Edward Thomas, Poems (posthumous) (including "Adlestrop")
 Sir William Watson, The Man Who Saw, and Other Poems Arising Out of the War
 Charles Williams, Poems of Conformity
 W. B. Yeats, The Wild Swans at Coole, Other Verses and a Play in Verse (Irish poet)

United States
 Conrad Aiken, Nocturne of Remembered Spring
 John Peale Bishop, Green Fruit
 , Jevons Block
 Witter Bynner, Grenstone Poems
 Florence Earle Coates (1850–1927), Pro Patria A 16-page pamphlet of seven war poems published privately in Philadelphia in support of American involvement in World War I.
 Hilda Doolittle (H.D.), The Tribute And Circe: Two Poems American poet published in the United Kingdom
 Edgar A. Guest, Just Folks
 Archibald MacLeish, Tower of Ivory
 Edna St. Vincent Millay, Renascence and Other Poems
 James Oppenheim, The Book of Self
 Edward Arlington Robinson, Merlin
 George Murphy, Thirty-five Sonnets
 Alan Seeger, Poems (posthumous)
 Wallace Stevens, "Thirteen Ways of Looking at a Blackbird"<ref>Published in October 1917 by Alfred Kreymborg in Others: An Anthology of the New Verse and two months later in the December issue of Others: A Magazine of the New Verse. See Others: An Anthology of the New Verse on Internet Archive.</ref>
 Sara Teasdale, Love Songs William Carlos Williams, A Book of Poems: Al Que Quiere!Other in English
 Nizamat Jung, Sonnets, London: Erskine Macdonald; Indian, Indian poetry in English, published in the United Kingdom
 Sarojini Naidu, The Broken Wing: Songs of Love, Death and the Spring, London; India, Indian poetry in English, published in the United Kingdom
 E. J. Pratt, Rachel: a sea story of Newfoundland, private. Canada.

Works published in other languages

France
 Guillaume Apollinaire, pen name of Wilhelm Apollinaris de Kostrowitzky, Vitam impendere amori Max Jacob, Le cornet a dés Philippe Soupault, Aquarium Paul Valéry, La Jeune ParqueIndian subcontinent
Including all of the British colonies that later became India, Pakistan, Bangladesh, Sri Lanka and Nepal. Listed alphabetically by first name, regardless of surname:
 Balawantrai Thakore, Bhanakar, Gujarati language
 Ci. Subrahamaniya Bharati, Kannan Pattu, Tamil language
 C. R. Sahasrabuddha, Kakaduta, a parody (a book with the same name by a different author was published in 1940), Sanskrit language
 Daulat Ram, Raja Gopi Cand, long narrative poem in the traditional genre of "Kissa", about the legend of Raja Gopi Chand, Punjabi language
 Duvvuri Rami Reddi, Nalajaramma agnipravesamu, Telugu language
 Hiteshwar Bar Barua, Desdimona Kavya, narrative poem inspired by Shakespeare's ' 'Othello' ', Assamese language
 Hiteshwar Barua, Angila, Assamese language
 Vallathol Narayana Menon, also known simply as "Vallathol", Sahityamanjari, Part I, Malayalam language

Other
 Artur Adson, Henge palango, Estonia
 Gottfried Benn, Fleisch, Germany
 António Botto, Trovas, Portugal
 Albert Ehrenstein, Die rote Zeit, Germany
 Walter Flex, Im Felde zwischen Nacht und Tag, Germany
 Stefan George, Der Krieg ("The War"); German
 Ulric-L. Gingras, La chanson du paysans; French language;, Canada
 Juan Ramón Jiménez, Diario de un poeta recién casado ("Diary of a Newly Married Poet"; later retitled Diario de poeta y mar ["Diary of Poet and Sea"), Spain
 Antonio Machado, Campos de Castilla ("Fields of Castile"), enlarged edition (first edition 1912); Spain
 Julio Molina Núñez and Juan Agustín Araya. Selva lírica, preparada, anthology, including work by Gabriela Mistral; Chile
 Giuseppe Ungaretti, Il porto sepolto ("The Buried Port"), Italy
 Henrik Visnapuu, Amores, Estonia

Births
Death years link to the corresponding "[year] in poetry" article:
 March 1 – Robert Lowell (died 1977), American poet
 March 17 – Takis Sinopoulos (died 1981), Greek poet
 April 9 – Johannes Bobrowski (died 1965), German lyric poet, fiction writer, adaptor and essayist
 June 7 – Gwendolyn Brooks (died 2000), African American poet
 June 30 – Judson Crews (died 2010), American poet
 July 5 – Stella Sierra (died 1997), Panamanian poet
 July 15 – Robert Conquest (died 2015), English-born historian and poet
 August 9 – Jao Tsung-I (died 2018), Chinese scholar, poet, translator, calligrapher and painter
 October 12 – James McAuley (died 1976), Australian poet
 December 9 – James Jesus Angleton (died 1987), American counterintelligence agent and poet
 December 14 – Tove Ditlevsen (suicide 1976), Danish poet and fiction writer
 December 30 – Yun Dong-ju (died 1945), Korean poet (surname: Yoon; also spelled "Yoon Dong-joo" and "Yun Tong-ju")
 Also:
 Rainer Brambach (died 1983), German poet
 Abdus Sattar Ranjoor Kashmiri (died 1990), Indian, Kashmiri-language poet
 Kamakshi Prasad Chattopadhyay (died 1976), Indian, Bengali-language poet and fiction writer
 P. N. Pushp (died 1998), Indian, Kashmiri-language scholar and poet
 Mario Augusto Rodriguez Velez (died 2009), Panamanian journalist, essayist, dramatist, poet and storyteller (surname: Rodriguez Velez)
 Sampath, pen name of Raghavacharya Sankhavaram, Indian, Telugu poet
 Themis, Indian poet of the Aurobindoean School
 Fadwa Tuqan (died 2003), Palestinian poet

Deaths

Birth years link to the corresponding "[year] in poetry" article:
 January 30 – Marion Juliet Mitchell, 80 (born 1836), American poet and educator
 April 7 – Susan Archer Weiss, 95 (born 1822), American poet
 April 20? – Jane Barlow, 60 (born 1857), Irish poet and novelist
 May 25 – Maksim Bahdanovič, 25 (born 1891), Belarusian poet, journalist and literary critic, of tuberculosis
 May 29 – Kate Harrington, 85 (born 1831), American teacher, writer and poet
 Also:
 Madhavanuj, pen name of Kashinath Hari Modak (born 1871), Indian, Marathi-language poet and translator; a physician
 Ismail Merathi (born 1844), Indian

Killed in World War I
 April 3 – Arthur Graeme West, English war poet and prose writer, shot by a sniper near Bapaume (born 1891)
 April 9
 Edward Thomas, British poet and prose writer, killed in action during the Battle of Arras, soon after his arrival in France (born 1878)
 R. E. Vernède, English war poet, died after being wounded by machine gun fire while leading an advance at Havrincourt (born 1875)
 July 31 – both killed in the Battle of Passchendaele near Ypres, Belgium
 Francis Ledwidge, Irish war poet, "poet of the blackbirds" (born 1887)
 Hedd Wyn, Welsh-language poet, killed while serving with 15th Battalion, Royal Welch Fusiliers at Pilckem Ridge (born 1887)
 September 17 – Arthur Sidgwick, English poet and essayist, died of wounds from aerial bomb near Ypres (born 1882)
 September 28 – T. E. Hulme, influential English poetry critic, killed by a shell at Oostduinkerke in Flanders Fields (born 1883)
 October 16 – Walter Flex, German war writer, died of wounds in Estonia (born 1887)
 November 23 – Ewart Alan Mackintosh, Scottish war poet, killed in the Battle of Cambrai (born 1893)

Awards and honors
 Nobel Prize for Literature: Karl Adolph Gjellerup, a Danish poet and novelist, shares the award with fellow Dane Henrik Pontoppidan

See also

 List of years in poetry
 Dada
 Imagism
 Modernist poetry in English
 Silver Age of Russian Poetry
 Ego-Futurism movement in Russian poetry
 Expressionism movement in German poetry
 Young Poland (Polish: Młoda Polska'') modernist period in Polish  arts and literature
 Poetry

Notes

Poetry
20th-century poetry